Theodorus Bailey (October 12, 1758September 6, 1828) was an American lawyer and politician from Poughkeepsie, New York, who represented New York in both the U.S. House and Senate.

Early life
Bailey was born near Fishkill in the Province of New York on October 12, 1758 where he attended the rural schools and studied law. He was admitted to the bar in 1778 and commenced practice in Poughkeepsie, New York.

Career
He served with the New York Militia during the Revolutionary War. He also served in the State militia from 1786 until 1805 and attained the rank of brigadier general.

Bailey ran for Congress in March 1789, but was defeated by Federalist Egbert Benson. Bailey was elected as a Democratic-Republican to the 3rd and the 4th United States Congresses, serving from March 4, 1793, to March 3, 1797. He was elected again to the 6th United States Congress, serving from March 4, 1799, to March 3, 1801. In April 1801, he was elected to the New York State Assembly, but vacated his seat before the State Legislature convened, because he was elected to the 7th United States Congress to fill the vacancy caused by the resignation of Thomas Tillotson, and served from December 7, 1801, to March 3, 1803.

In 1803, Bailey was elected a U.S. Senator from New York, and served from March 4, 1803, to January 16, 1804,  when he resigned to accept the position of Postmaster of New York City, which he held until his death.

Personal life
Bailey was married to Rebecca Tallmadge (1779-1807). She was the daughter of Col. James Tallmadge (1744-1821) and the sister of Matthias B. Tallmadge (1774-1819), a federal judge from New York, and James Tallmadge Jr. (1778–1853), who was a U.S. Representative and who served as Lieutenant Governor of New York under De Witt Clinton. Together, they were the parents of:

 Catherine Rebecca Bailey (1804-1844), who married William Cecil Woolsey (1796-1840) in 1829.
 Ann Eliza Bailey (d. 1878), who married Arthur Bronson (1801–1844), a son of Isaac Bronson.

Bailey died in New York, New York County, New York, on September 6, 1828 (age 69 years, 330 days). He was interred at Dutch Burying Ground, Manhattan, New York; and was re-interred on January 8, 1864, at Poughkeepsie Rural Cemetery, Poughkeepsie, New York.

References

External links

1758 births
1828 deaths
People from Fishkill, New York
People of the Province of New York
American people of English descent
Anti-Administration Party members of the United States House of Representatives from New York (state)
Democratic-Republican Party members of the United States House of Representatives from New York (state)
Democratic-Republican Party United States senators from New York (state)
Members of the New York State Assembly
Postmasters of New York City
American slave owners
Politicians from New York City
Politicians from Poughkeepsie, New York
United States militia in the American Revolution
Burials at Poughkeepsie Rural Cemetery
United States senators who owned slaves